The Journal of Interconnection Networks was established in 2000 and is published by World Scientific. It covers the field of interconnection networks from theory and analysis to design and implementation, as well as corresponding issues of communication, computing and function. This includes topics structures and functions in biological systems and neural networks.

Abstracting and indexing 
The journal is abstracted and indexed in Inspec, DBLP Bibliography Server, and io-port.net.

External links 
 

English-language journals
Computer science journals
Publications established in 2000
World Scientific academic journals